This is a list of lakes in the Commonwealth of Virginia in the United States. Virginia has two natural lakes, and several man-made lakes and reservoirs.

Natural lakes
 Lake Drummond
 Mountain Lake

Other lakes and reservoirs
 Abel Reservoir
 Amelia Lake
 Lake Anna
 Lake Barcroft
 Beaver Creek Reservoir
 Beaverdam Creek Reservoir
 Beaverdam Swamp Reservoir
 Briery Creek Lake
 Buggs Island Lake (Kerr Lake (officially John H. Kerr Reservoir))
 Burke Lake
 Burnt Mills Reservoir
 Lake Chesdin
 Claytor Lake
 Lake Conner
 Curtis Lake
 Diascund Reservoir
 Emporia Reservoir
 Lake Fairfax
 Fairy Stone Lake
 Flannagan Reservoir
 Lake Frederick
 Lake Gaston (Also extends into North Carolina).
 Gatewood Reservoir
 Germantown Lake
 Lake Gordon (Virginia)
 Great Creek Watershed Lake
 Harwoods Mill Reservoir
 Holiday Lake
 Hungry Mother Lake
 Lake Kilby
 Loch Lothian
 Keokee Lake
 Laurel Bed Lake
 Lee Hall Reservoir (Newport News City Reservoir)
 Leesville Reservoir
 Lake Manassas
 The Mariners' Lake
 Martinsville Reservoir
 Lake Meade (Virginia)
 Lake Moomaw
 Motts Run Reservoir
 Ni Reservoir
 North Fork Pound Reservoir (Pound Lake)
 Nottoway Lake
 Occoquan Reservoir
 Lake Orange
 Pelham Reservoir
 Philpott Reservoir
 Lake Prince
 Rivanna Reservoir
 Sandy Bottom Park Pond
 Sandy River Reservoir
 Skidmore Reservoir
 Lake Smith
 Smith Mountain Lake
 South Holston Lake
 Swift Creek Lake
 Waller Mill Reservoir
 Western Branch Reservoir
 Lake Whitehurst
 Lake Jackson
 Lake of the Woods, Virginia
 Lake Accotink

References

Lakes
Virginia